Giovanni Micheletto (Sacile, 21 January 1889 — Sacile, 29 September 1958) was an Italian professional road racing cyclist, nicknamed by fans "The Sacile Count" (from his native town in the province of Pordenone) and "Nanè". The highlight of his career was his overall win in the 1912 Giro d'Italia. He was also the first Italian cyclist to win a race in France, Paris-Menin in 1913.

Palmarès 

1910
Giro di Lombardia
Giro di Romagna-Toscana
1912
Giro d'Italia:
 Winner overall classification (with Team Atala)
Winner stages 1 and 8
1913
Paris-Menin
Tour de France:
Winner stage 1
Wearing yellow jersey for one day

External links 

Official Tour de France results for Giovanni Micheletto

1889 births
1958 deaths
People from Sacile
Italian male cyclists
Giro d'Italia winners
Cyclists from Friuli Venezia Giulia